Dexbrompheniramine/pseudoephedrine (trade name Drixoral) is a combination medication that contains the antihistamine dexbrompheniramine maleate and the decongestant pseudoephedrine sulfate. It was used to treat symptoms associated with allergies and colds such as itchy and watery eyes, runny nose, nasal and sinus congestion, and sneezing. Because it contains pseudoephedrine, its purchase in the United States was severely restricted by the Combat Methamphetamine Epidemic Act of 2005 over fears that any product containing pseudoephedrine can be used to make methamphetamine.

Availability
As of 2008, Drixoral was removed from the US market by manufacturer Merck. The company's updated website attributes "changing [their] manufacturing location" for the supply disruption and currently states "it is unlikely product will be available in 2010". However, the trade name Drixoral is now used in Canada for an oxymetazoline hydrochloride nasal spray.

Commercials
Drixoral was a very popular cold relief medicine advertised on U.S. television in the 1980s.  Many of their commercials were narrated by the late Burgess Meredith.

References

Decongestants
H1 receptor antagonists
Combination drugs